Notorious Lightning and Other Works is an EP by Destroyer, released on January 25, 2005, on Merge Records. After shocking many fans by supporting the synth-driven album Your Blues with the avant-guitar band Frog Eyes, Dan Bejar decided to put to tape some of the very different versions of songs from Your Blues.  Similar versions of these songs are currently streaming from CBC Radio Three.

Track listing

Personnel 
Dan Bejar
Carey Mercer
Melanie Campbell
Michael Rak
Grayson Walker

References

External links 
Destroyer Studio Session - Recorded by CBC Radio Three with Frog Eyes.

Destroyer (band) EPs
2005 debut EPs